This is a list of Hungarian football transfers in the summer transfer window 2017 by club. Only transfers in Nemzeti Bajnokság I, and Nemzeti Bajnokság II are included.

Nemzeti Bajnokság I

Balmazújváros

In:

Out:

Budapest Honvéd

In:

Out:

Debrecen

In:

Out:

Diósgyőr

In:

Out:

Ferencváros

In:

Out:

Mezőkövesd

In:

Out:

Paks

In:

Out:

Puskás Akadémia

In:

Out:

Videoton

In:

Out:

See also
 2017–18 Nemzeti Bajnokság I
 2017–18 Nemzeti Bajnokság II
 2017–18 Nemzeti Bajnokság III
 2017–18 Magyar Kupa

References

External links
 Official site of the Hungarian Football Association
 Official site of the Nemzeti Bajnokság I

Hungarian
Transfers
2017